Weijianian is a station, on Line 1, of the Chengdu Metro in China, it is the northern terminus of Line 1.

Station layout

Gallery

References

Railway stations in Sichuan
Railway stations in China opened in 2018
Chengdu Metro stations